The Humboldt Bay Power Plant, Unit 3 was a 63 MWe nuclear boiling water reactor, owned by Pacific Gas and Electric Company that operated from August 1963 to July 1976 just south of Eureka, California.

History
On Monday, January 23, 1961, Pacific Gas and Electric held a luncheon to invite the community to observe the start of the major construction of the nuclear unit.

It was shut down for refueling and seismic upgrades in July 1976, which dragged on due to changing requirements. Concern about previously undiscovered seismic faults combined with more stringent requirements required after the Three Mile Island accident rendered the small plant unprofitable if restarted.

Missing fuel rods
In 2004 Pacific Gas and Electric announced that three nuclear fuel rods were unaccounted for due to conflicting records of their location.  The fuel rods were never accounted for, though PG&E investigators believed at the time that they were still onsite in the spent fuel storage pool.  The investigation is believed to have cost one million dollars.

Decommissioning
Unit 3 was permanently shutdown on 2 July 1976. PG&E announced plans to shutter the plant in 1983, and it was then placed in SAFSTOR inactive status in 1988.

In December 2003, PG&E submitted a license application for a spent fuel storage facility, which was issued in November 2005. In December 2008, PG&E finished moving the spent nuclear fuel into dry cask storage on site. The dismantlement of the nuclear unit  began in 2010 along with the two original fossil-fuel-powered steam-turbine generators on site. The plant's power was replaced  by an array of modern, multi-fuel Wärtsilä reciprocating engine-generators in late 2010. The complete dismantlement of Humboldt Bay Power Plant is expected to finish in 2018.

In the 2012 Nuclear Decommissioning Cost Triennial Proceeding (NDCTP) of the California Public Utilities Commission (CPUC), PG&E requested approval to expend additional funds to remove more of the subterranean unit. As of 2009, PG&E planned to leave in place all HBPP3 structures three feet or more below grade (except for the Spent Nuclear Fuel (SNF) pool), including the concrete caisson surrounding the reactor vessel. In 2012, PG&E concluded that complete removal of the reactor caisson, and containment by a cement slurry wall, is the only appropriate alternative to meet NRC standards for remediating C-14 contamination. Currently, used fuel rods are being stored 44 feet above sea level in containers with very heavy lids. These containers are filled with helium, an inert gas, and will remain onsite so long as Congress and the Department of Energy does not comply with its agreement under the Nuclear Waste Policy Act of 1982. According to the NRC (Nuclear Regulatory Commission), the dry casks are safe for at least 60 years beyond their licensing agreement.

Based on PG&E's schedule of planned decommissioning activities, which incorporates various assumptions, including approval of its proposed new scope, decommissioning of the Unit 3 site was expected to conclude in 2019.

Between 2010 and about 2018, the facility was completely decontaminated and dismantled after being some 20 year in SAFSTOR. A license termination was issued in October 2021 and the site released for unrestricted use. A new license was issued for an on-site storage facility for the spent fuel. PG&E remains responsible for safely decommissioning the storage facility site after disposal of the fuel.

References

External links 

NRC page on Humboldt Bay
Humboldt Nuke Faces Dismantling

Energy infrastructure completed in 1963
Historic American Engineering Record in California
Nuclear power plants in California
Buildings and structures in Humboldt County, California
Eureka, California
Pacific Gas and Electric Company
1963 establishments in California
1976 disestablishments in California
Former nuclear power stations in the United States